The Škoda Fabia R5 is a rally car built by Škoda Motorsport. It is based upon the Škoda Fabia road car and is built to R5 regulations. It made its competition début in 2015 as a successor to the Škoda Fabia S2000. The car proved to be very successful in the World Rally Championship-2 class, winning thirty-five events between 2015 and 2018. Esapekka Lappi won the 2016 World Rally Championship-2 drivers title with four victories, Pontus Tidemand won the 2017 championship and Jan Kopecký won the 2018 championship. Škoda Motorsport won the FIA World Rally Championship-2 for Teams in 2015, 2016 and 2017. Starting in 2019, Škoda Motorsport entered the Fabia R5 in the professional class of the World Rally Championship-2. An updated version of the Fabia R5 known as the Škoda Fabia R5 Evo was introduced during the 2019 season. The car was originally launched with the R5 group nomenclature, but in early 2020, Škoda Motorsport announced the update of their car names according to the new FIA pyramid, renaming successor, the Fabia R5 evo as the Fabia Rally2 evo.

The Fabia R5 has also competed in regional rally championships in Europe the Asia-Pacific and Codasur South American Rally Championships. Gaurav Gill won the 2016 and 2017 Asia-Pacific titles and Yuya Sumiyama won the 2018 championship. Gustavo Saba won the 2016, 2017 and 2018 Codasur South American Rally Championships. The car has also won a further fourteen rounds of the European Rally Championship.

From a commercial and competitive standpoint, the Fabia is the one of the most successful cars in the history of the R5 category, winning over 700 rally competitions all around the world, and selling over 240 units to independent teams and owners over a three-and-a-half year period.

Results

World Championships

World Rally Championship-2 victories

Regional championships

European Rally Championship victories

Asia-Pacific Rally Championship victories

See also
 Group R
 Citroën C3 R5
 Ford Fiesta R5
 Hyundai i20 R5
 Volkswagen Polo GTI R5

References

External links

Škoda Fabia R5 at skoda-motorsport.com
Škoda Fabia R5 at ewrc-results.com
ŠKODA FABIA Rally2 at fabiarally2.cz
Škoda Fabia R5 at 4x4schweiz.ch

R5 cars
Fabia R5
Cars introduced in 2015
2010s cars
All-wheel-drive vehicles
Cars of the Czech Republic